Yvonne Jaqueline Strzechowski (born 30 July 1982), known professionally as Yvonne Strahovski, is an Australian actress. Primarily noted for her roles in dramatic television, she has received numerous awards and nominations, including two Primetime Emmy Award nominations and three Screen Actors Guild Award nominations.

She is best known for roles as CIA agent Sarah Walker in the NBC spy comedy drama series Chuck (2007–2012), Hannah McKay in the Showtime drama series Dexter (2012–2013), and CIA Agent Kate Morgan in the Fox event series 24: Live Another Day (2014). She stars as Serena Joy Waterford in the Hulu drama series The Handmaid's Tale (2017–present), for which she has received nominations for two Primetime Emmy Awards, three Screen Actors Guild Awards and a Golden Globe Award.

Strahovski's other notable works include Lego: The Adventures of Clutch Powers (2010), The Guilt Trip (2012), Killer Elite (2011), I, Frankenstein (2014), The Astronaut Wives Club (2015), Manhattan Night (2016), All I See Is You (2016), He's Out There (2018), The Predator (2018) and The Tomorrow War (2021). She voiced Miranda Lawson in the Mass Effect video game series and Batwoman in the animated superhero film Batman: Bad Blood (2016).

Early life
Strahovski was born in the Sydney suburb of Werrington Downs, New South Wales, Australia the daughter of Piotr and Bożena Strzechowski; her parents emigrated from Warsaw, Poland. Her father is an electronic engineer, and her mother is a lab technician. Strahovski began acting lessons at age 12 and spent her high school years attending Santa Sabina College, Strathfield. She attended the University of Western Sydney's Theatre Nepean in 2003 and co-founded a small theater company.

Career

Strahovski started acting at school when she played Viola in the school production of Twelfth Night. She appeared in film and television roles in Australia, including a turn on satirical show Double the Fist and as Freya Lewis in the Australian drama series headLand. She has also appeared in Channel Nine's Sea Patrol.

Strahovski sent in her audition tape for the TV series Chuck while in the United States auditioning for roles in other shows, namely NBC's 2007 series Bionic Woman. After running lines with Zachary Levi she was cast as Sarah Walker. Six months later, she moved to the United States. Strahovski adopted the more phonetic spelling of Strahovski as her stage name in place of Strzechowski at this time, at producer Josh Schwartz's behest.

Strahovski is fluent in Polish and English, and employed it in a brief exchange with a colleague in the Chuck episode "Chuck Versus the Wookiee" and again in the episodes "Chuck Versus the Three Words" and "Chuck Versus the Honeymooners". Although she portrays an American in the series, she briefly spoke in a "Hollywood" Australian accent in the episode "Chuck Versus the Ex".

Strahovski appears in Mass Effect Galaxy, Mass Effect 2, and Mass Effect 3 as the voice of Miranda Lawson. She had her face scanned and animated so she could portray Lawson in Mass Effect 2.

Strahovski voices Aya Brea in the English version of the Parasite Eve spinoff, The 3rd Birthday. She appeared in a CollegeHumor sketch in April 2011, parodying the music styles of Katy Perry, Ke$ha, Lady Gaga, and Justin Bieber.

Strahovski appeared in the 2011 film Killer Elite, alongside Jason Statham, Clive Owen, and Robert De Niro. She appeared in the 2012 comedy The Guilt Trip, opposite Seth Rogen and Barbra Streisand.

In 2010, Strahovski received the Teen Choice Award for Choice Action TV Actress for Chuck, as well as a nomination for Spike Video Game Awards for Best Performance by a Human Female for Mass Effect 2. In 2011, Strahovski was nominated again for the Teen Choice Awards for Choice Action TV Actress. In 2011, Cosmopolitan Magazine (Australia) named Strahovski the Fun Fearless Female of the Year, along with Favorite TV Actress.

In November 2011, Strahovski was cast as the female lead in I, Frankenstein (2014). In March 2012, she featured in a new SoBe Life commercial. In May 2012, Strahovski ranked No. 35 in Maxim Hot 100. In June 2012, Showtime announced Strahovski had joined the cast for the seventh season of Dexter portraying Hannah McKay, a woman involved with an investigation following the death of her former lover, a spree killer whom she accompanied when she was a teenager. She reprised the role in the eighth season of Dexter.

In December 2012, she made her Broadway debut in a revival of Clifford Odets' Golden Boy, for which she won a Theatre World Award. Strahovski was honored along with Liam Hemsworth for their work in international roles with the 2012 Australians in Film Breakthrough Award.

In 2014, Strahovski joined Fox's TV series 24: Live Another Day cast as Kate Morgan, CIA agent. Later that year, she was cast as Rene Carpenter on the ABC limited series The Astronaut Wives Club. In 2016, she starred, along with Adrien Brody, as Caroline Crowley in the film noir Manhattan Night. She was featured in Maxim Hot 100 from 2009 to 2013.

Since 2017, she has starred as Serena Joy Waterford in the acclaimed Hulu drama series The Handmaid's Tale. For her performance, Strahovski earned a Primetime Emmy Award nomination for Outstanding Supporting Actress in a Drama Series in 2018. She also starred as Sofie Werner in the limited series Stateless (2020).

Personal life
At the 69th Primetime Emmy Awards in September 2017, Strahovski revealed that she had married Tim Loden (b. 1982), her partner of six years. They have two sons: the first born October 2018, and a second born December 2021.

Filmography

Film

Television

Video games

Web

Awards and nominations

References

Further reading

External links

 
 
 
 

Australian expatriate actresses in the United States
Australian film actresses
Australian people of Polish descent
Australian television actresses
Australian video game actresses
Australian voice actresses
Living people
Actresses from New South Wales
21st-century Australian actresses
Western Sydney University alumni
Articles containing video clips
1982 births
Theatre World Award winners